Karl Briker (21 December 1923 – 30 August 1992) was a Swiss cross-country skier who competed in the 1940s and in the 1950s. At the 1948 Winter Olympics he finished 41st in the 18 km competition. Four years later he finished 46th in the 18 km event at the 1952 Winter Olympics in Oslo.

External links
18 km Olympic cross country results: 1948-52

Swiss military patrol (sport) runners
Olympic cross-country skiers of Switzerland
Cross-country skiers at the 1948 Winter Olympics
Cross-country skiers at the 1952 Winter Olympics
Swiss male cross-country skiers
1923 births
1992 deaths